José Aurelio Gay López (born 10 December 1965) is a Spanish retired footballer who played as a midfielder, and the manager of Bolivian club CD Vaca Díez.

He was associated with Zaragoza throughout his career, serving the club as both a player and manager. He amassed La Liga totals of 180 matches and 27 goals over eight seasons, starting out at Castilla.

After starting working in that capacity in 2000, Gay went on to coach a host of clubs in Segunda División and Segunda División B.

Playing career
Born in Madrid, Gay began playing football with Real Madrid, eventually progressing to the reserves, Castilla CF. While at the club he was a member of the Spain under-20 side that finished runners-up at the 1985 FIFA World Youth Championship, starting in five of six games and appearing as a substitute in the other.

After four seasons in the second division, Gay moved up to La Liga with RCD Español in the summer of 1988. He scored twice in 17 matches during his debut season, in which the Catalans were relegated, but eventually established himself in the starting XI, spending one season in the second level and another in the first; in 1990–91, his last year, he was the team's second-highest league goalscorer with five goals – only behind German Wolfram Wuttke – as he helped them retain their top-flight status.

Gay moved to Real Zaragoza in the 1991 off-season. In consecutive seasons he helped the Aragonese to the 1994 domestic cup and the following year's UEFA Cup Winners' Cup, although he was seriously injured during the latter campaign. He only appeared sparingly afterwards, and left the club in June 1996.

Gay's final three seasons were spent at Real Oviedo and CD Toledo, with whom he spent two years in division two, amassing only 43 league appearances both clubs combined and retiring in 1999 at the age of 33. In total, he played in nearly 350 matches both major levels of Spanish football combined.

Coaching career
After his retirement, Gay managed numerous teams in both the second and third tiers, starting at his last club Toledo one year after hanging up his boots. Real Madrid C, Pontevedra CF, Real Jaén, Lorca Deportiva CF, CF Fuenlabrada and Real Zaragoza B followed– he took the reins of the latter's first team following the dismissal of Marcelino García Toral, on 12 December 2009.

Gay's first game in charge of Zaragoza saw them lose 6–0 away against Real Madrid, a result that led to rumours that he would be replaced by Víctor Muñoz. The reports, however, proved to be unfounded and he was offered the job until the summer of 2010; after bringing in several new players in the January transfer window, the side's fortunes began to turn as he led them out of the relegation zone by mid-February, eventually finishing in 14th position.

In mid-November 2010, with Zaragoza ranking last in the league (eventually managing to avoid relegation), Gay was sacked. On 12 December 2012, after more than two years out of work, he replaced fired Fabri at the helm of Racing de Santander, lasting until March in a season that saw the Cantabrians relegated to the third division.

Gay returned to Real Madrid C in November 2013. He led the team to a top-half finish, but they were relegated to Tercera División due to the fate of Castilla and disbanded in 2015.

In August 2016, Gay ran training sessions for CD Palencia Balompié but did not manage the club in an official match. He signed a one-year deal with the option of a second at third-tier RCD Espanyol B in June 2019.

Managerial statistics

Honours

Player
Spain U20
FIFA U-20 World Cup: Runner-up 1985

Manager
Pontevedra
Segunda División B: 2003–04

References

External links

1965 births
Living people
Footballers from Madrid
Spanish footballers
Association football midfielders
La Liga players
Segunda División players
Real Madrid Castilla footballers
RCD Espanyol footballers
Real Zaragoza players
Real Oviedo players
CD Toledo players
Spain youth international footballers
Spain under-21 international footballers
Spanish football managers
La Liga managers
Segunda División managers
Segunda División B managers
CD Toledo managers
Real Madrid C managers
Pontevedra CF managers
Real Jaén managers
Lorca Deportiva CF managers
CF Fuenlabrada managers
Real Zaragoza managers
Racing de Santander managers
RCD Espanyol B managers
C.D. Vaca Díez managers
Spanish expatriate football managers
Spanish expatriate sportspeople in Bolivia
Expatriate football managers in Bolivia